The 2nd Regiment, Texas Infantry was an infantry regiment from Texas that served with Confederate States Army in the American Civil War. The regiment was organized by the then Captain John Creed Moore who would become the regiment's 1st Colonel. Many of the men were from Houston and Galveston.

Notable battles that the regiment has been involved in include the Battle of Shiloh, the Second Battle of Corinth, and the Siege of Vicksburg.

Second Battle of Corinth

The regiment assaulted Battery Robinett, a redan protected by a five-foot ditch, sporting three 20-pounder Parrott rifles commanded by Lt. Henry Robinett.  Colonel William P. Rogers, a Mexican–American War comrade of President Jefferson Davis, was among those killed in the charge.   Rogers seized his colors to keep them from falling again and jumped a five-foot ditch, leaving his dying horse and assaulted the ramparts of the battery.  When canister shot killed him, he was the fifth bearer of his colors to fall that day.

Siege of Vicksburg

The regiment was distinguished for its defense of a crescent-shaped fortification, which came to be known as the Second Texas Lunette.  The fortification was located in the center of the Vicksburg line of defense constructed to guard the Baldwin Ferry Road.  The lunette was the subject of tremendous artillery bombardment and repeated Union assaults directed against the lunette on May 22, 1863.

References

External links
 2nd Texas Infantry Regiment
 2nd Texas Lunette at Vicksburg

Further reading
 The Second Texas Infantry: From Shiloh to Vicksburg, Joseph Chance, Eakin Press, 1984

See also
Texas Civil War Confederate Units
Texas in the American Civil War

Units and formations of the Confederate States Army from Texas